This is a list of members of the National Parliament of Papua New Guinea from 1977 to 1982, as elected at the 1977 election.

Notes

References

List
Papua New Guinea politics-related lists